JamMan may refer to:

Lexicon JamMan, a looper device for electric musical instruments
DigiTech JamMan, a looper device unrelated to the Lexicon JamMan